Chuang Yen Monastery is a Buddhist temple situated on  in Kent, Putnam County, New York, in the United States. The temple is home to the largest indoor statue of a Buddha (Vairocana) in the Western Hemisphere. The name "Chuang Yen" means "Majestically Adorned".

History
In November 1975, the Buddhist Association of the United States (BAUS) leased 125 acres of land in Putnam County from Dr. C.T. Shen (one of the co-founders of BAUS and late vice president of BAUS) for the development of Chuang Yen Monastery. According to the temple, the lease was for ninety-nine years with an annual payment of one dollar. As suggested by the local government, Dr. Shen donated the land to BAUS in 1989.

Much of the temple buildings are built in the architectural style of China's Tang dynasty, and was designed by architect Edward A Valeri RA. On May 23, 1981, a groundbreaking ceremony was held for the first building, the Kuan Yin Hall. The other buildings that make up the monastery were added over the years: the Dining Hall, the Thousand Lotus Memorial Terrace, the Tai Hsu Hall, the Yin Kuang Hall, the Woo Ju Memorial Library and the Great Buddha Hall. The Great Buddha Hall's opening was presided over by the 14th Dalai Lama.

Leadership
The first president of BAUS, Venerable Lok To, laid the foundation of BAUS. Venerables Ming Chi and Xian Ming, together with Dr. Shen, took on the challenge and assumed the responsibility of building and serving Chuang Yen Monastery.

 Jen Chun (President of BAUS 1980 – 1986 & 2002 – 2007)
 Sheng-yen (Abbot of Great Enlightenment Temple 1977 – 1978)
 Shou Yu (Abbot of CYM 1999 – 2001)
 Ming Kuang (Abbot of CYM 2001 – 2002, President of BAUS 1999 – 2002),
 Ji Ru (Abbot of CYM 2002 – 2004)
 Jing Tong (Abbot of CYM 2004 – 2007)
 Ji Xing (President of BAUS 2007 – 2013)
 Dhammadipa (Fa Yao; Abbot of CYM 2008 – 2015)
 Hui Tsong (Abbot of CYM 2016 – 2018)
 Yung Hsin & Hong Zhen (Co-Abbesses of CYM 2019 – Present)

Services
World Peace: Ever since the inception of Chuang Yen Monastery, visitors have been a melting pot of religious faiths. Weekends, especially Sundays, Buddhists and non-Buddhists alike visit CYM for programs including sitting and walking meditation, lectures, book discussion programs, and they enjoy a vegetarian lunch at the Dining Hall. Interfaith Prayer has been held annually on New Year's Day to promote mutual understanding among all the religions.

Community Service: Every year, events such as Chinese New Year Blessing Ceremony, Garden Party on Mother's Day, Ritual for the Deceased, and Summer Camp have been put together. Donations are made to senior centers, fire departments, and food banks when possible. Volunteers take the initiative and coordinate events for public awareness when disasters occur around the world.

Free Book Distribution is a program where books are free for visitors and are sent to prisoners if requested. This is due to the contributions of many Buddhist masters, authors, and donators all around the world.

School Program: To support educational needs in the tri-state areas and to welcome ethnic groups, volunteers with different ethnic backgrounds make a dedication to the program. Each year, CYM serves thousands of students who visit the grounds, and also accepts invitations for talks in schools, prisons, and community centers.

Retreat: According to Buddhism, world peace starts from inner peace. The principle of Buddhism teaches: "Do no evil, cultivate good. Purify one’s mind." This is the teaching of Buddhism. CYM offers retreats throughout the year for people to spend time to develop inner peace. CYM invites Buddhist masters from other states or countries to conduct retreats.

References

External links
 www.baus.org Official website

Buddhist temples in New York (state)
Buddhist monasteries in the United States
Buddhist meditation
Buildings and structures in Putnam County, New York